Mehrjerd castle is a historical castle located in Meybod County in Yazd Province, The longevity of this fortress dates back to the Prehistoric times of ancient Afsharid dynasty and Zand dynasty.

References 

Castles in Iran